Sir Henry Carstairs Pelly, 3rd Baronet (24 April 1844 - 4 June 1877) was a Conservative Party politician.

Parliamentary career
Pelly was elected Conservative MP for Huntingdonshire in 1874, but died before completing a full parliamentary term in 1877.

Baronetage
Pelly succeeded to 3rd Baronet of Upton upon his father John Pelly's death on 20 December 1864.

Personal life
Pelly married Lady Lilian Harriet Charteris, daughter of Francis Charteris, 10th Earl of Wemyss on 27 November 1872.

Other activities
During his life, Pelly was a Justice of the Peace, a Deputy Lieutenant, and captain in the 2nd Regiment of Life Guards.

References

External links
 

1844 births
1877 deaths
Conservative Party (UK) MPs for English constituencies
UK MPs 1874–1880
People from the London Borough of Barnet